The Metropolitan Fire Brigade (MFB), also known as the Metropolitan Fire and Emergency Services Board, was a fire service in Victoria, Australia. The MFB provided firefighting, rescue, medical and hazardous material incident response services to the metropolitan area of Melbourne. The MFB's headquarters were located at the Eastern Hill Fire Station (also known as Fire Station 1) in East Melbourne.

The MFB was abolished in 2020 and its stations and firefighters absorbed into the newly created Fire Rescue Victoria.

History
The first known fire brigade in Melbourne was the volunteer Melbourne Fire Prevention Society established in 1845. Over a period of years a number of volunteer brigades were formed bearing the names of insurance companies and municipalities, and other institutions e.g. Carlton Brewery, Fitzroy Temperance. There was intense rivalry between these brigades. Buildings had wooden or metal plaques in the form of an insurance brigades coat of arms or firemark affixed to their exteriors denoting which insurance company had the building under its care. When the fire alarm was given many companies would rush to the scene, the mark would be inspected, and only the brigade that owned the mark would fight the fire while the other companies would do their best to hinder the operation. By 1890 there were 56 such volunteer brigades in Melbourne.

After several serious fires in 1890, with the loss of life of six firefighters in addition to loss of property, the Fire Brigades Act 1890 was passed with the aim of uniting these rival fire brigades. The first meeting of the Metropolitan Fire Brigade (MFB) board took place on 6 March 1891, and led to the disbanding of the then 56 volunteer brigades in Melbourne on 30 April 1891 with an invitation to firefighters to join the new organisation. On May 1, 1891 the Melbourne Fire Brigade became the main fire brigade in Melbourne. The first annual report of the MFB stated its strength as "59 permanent firefighters, 229 auxiliary firefighters, 4 steam fire engines, 25 horse drawn hose carts and 58 hose reels... 33 horses and 48 stations". In 1891, the Brigade attended 816 calls and 485 fires, of which 188 fires were classified as serious.

The first fire station constructed by the MFB was the Eastern Hill Fire Station, opposite St Peter's, Eastern Hill, one of the highest points in the city of Melbourne. Construction commenced in 1891 and the station opened on 3 November 1893. The building contained living quarters, stables, workshops, and offices. A watchtower was initially manned 24 hours a day. Firefighters lived on the premises until the 1970s.

In 1950, volunteer and partly-paid firefighters were discontinued in favour of solely full-time fire service. In September 1988, female firefighters were permitted to join the MFB.

The MFB had more than 2200 employees, including over 1900 firefighters and almost 350 corporate staff.

In 2019, legislation to abolish the MFB and replace it with a new organisation, Fire Rescue Victoria (FRV), passed the Parliament of Victoria. When the changes are implemented in 2020, FRV will assume all of the functions of the MFB, as well as employing all paid firefighters across the state, including those on the outskirts of Melbourne and in regional cities previously employed by the Country Fire Authority.

Functions
The functions of the MFB are set out in section 2 of the Metropolitan Fire Brigades Act 1958 as being to provide fire suppression and fire prevention services as well as emergency prevention and response services in the Metropolitan Fire District.

The MFB responds to about 38,000 calls per year for a range of Emergencies including:
 fires (structure, non-structure, bushfire)
 hazardous incidents
 road accident rescue
 emergency medical response (with Ambulance Victoria)
 automatic alarm response
 high angle rescue
 urban search and rescue
 marine response

Fire stations and appliances
The Metropolitan Fire District (MFD) encompasses over 1000 square kilometres of Metropolitan Melbourne, with 47 strategically placed Fire Stations to ensure a timely response to emergencies.
The MFB fire stations are listed below under the five districts which make up the MFD. Central District, Western District and Northern District combine as the North West Metro Region, while Southern District and Eastern District form the South East Metro Region.

North West Metro Region

Central District

Western District

Northern District

South East Metro Region

Southern District

Eastern District

Fire appliance glossary 

The MFB operates a range of appliances to match the varied firefighting and rescue roles it provides. All stations have at least one pumper or pumper tanker, while some stations also have more specialised appliances such as water tankers, ladder platforms, telebooms, heavy rescue trucks, or other support vehicles.

 Breathing Apparatus Unit (BA)
 Breathing Apparatus Support (BS)
 Command Unit (CU)
 Decontamination Unit (Hazmat)
 District Car (DC)
 Fire Boat (FB)
 Ladder Platform (LP)
 Pumper (P)
 Pumper Tanker (PT)
 Rescue (R)
 Rehabilitation Unit (Rehab)
 Teleboom (TB)
 Transporter (T)
 Ultra Large Pumper (ULP)
 Water Tanker (WT) (Mostly out of service now)

Pods:

 Breathing Apparatus (BA)
 Bulk Decontamination (BD)
 Equipment & Resource Management (ERM)
 Fire Duty Support (FDS)
 General Purpose (GP)
 High Angle Rescue (HAR)
 Hose Layer (HL)
 Heavy Rescue Support (HRS)
 Mechanical Loader (ML)
 Tipper/Rescue Support (TRS)
 Urban Search & Rescue no.1 (USAR-1)
 Water Recycling Module no.3 (WRM-3)
 Water Recycling Module no.5 (WRM-5)

Notable incidents
 William Booth Memorial Home fire – On 13 August 1966, a heater started a fire at a Salvation Army hostel for alcoholic and destitute men. Due to the failure of the staff to immediately call the MFB, and the building's design hindering escape, dozens of victims became trapped. 30 ultimately died, making it the deadliest building fire in Australian history.
 2018 West Footscray warehouse fire – An illegal chemical storage facility caught fire on 30 August and burned for over a week. A large plume of toxic black smoke drifted over surrounding suburbs.
 2019 Campbellfield factory fire – A fire began on 5 April at a waste management facility which took 4 days to extinguish. Toxic fumes forced the evacuation of nearby residential suburbs and closure of several schools.

See also
 Australasian Fire and Emergency Service Authorities Council
 Country Fire Authority
 Country Fire Service
 New South Wales Fire Brigades

References

External links

 Metropolitan Fire Brigade website
 MFB Act
 Fire Services Museum of Victoria

Fire and rescue services of Victoria (Australia)
Organisations based in Melbourne
1891 establishments in Australia